Węgój  is a village in the administrative district of Gmina Biskupiec, within Olsztyn County, Warmian-Masurian Voivodeship, in northern Poland. Węgój holds a recreation of the Crucifixion of Jesus every Easter.

References

Villages in Olsztyn County